Réjean Lafrenière (31 August 1935 – 30 April 2016) was a Canadian politician who was a member of the National Assembly of Quebec for the Liberal Party of Quebec from 1989 to 2007.  Prior to that, he was mayor of Lac-Sainte-Marie, Quebec from 1967 to 1989.

First elected in the 1989 election, he was re-elected in 1994, 1998, 2003.  He did not run for re-election in 2007.

References

External links
 

1935 births
2016 deaths
Quebec Liberal Party MNAs
French Quebecers
Mayors of places in Quebec
21st-century Canadian politicians